Kaly is a 2018 Indian Malayalam-language thriller drama film co-written and directed by Najeem Koya. Produced by Shaji Nadesan, Prithviraj Sukumaran, Arya, and Santosh Sivan through August Cinema. Screenplay and Dialogues written by Najeem Koya and Arouz Irfan (who wrote story, screenplay and dialogues for 'IDI'). It features Shebin Benson, Anil K Reji, Shalu Rahim, Vidhya Vijay in lead roles. The film was released on 9 February 2018.

Cast

Soundtrack

References

External links
 

2018 films
2010s Malayalam-language films
Indian buddy films
Indian thriller drama films
Films scored by Rahul Raj